Tomi Pettinen (born June 17, 1977) is a Finnish former professional ice hockey defenceman. He played 24 games in the National Hockey League with the New York Islanders between 2002 and 2006. The rest of his career, which lasted from 1996 to 2012, was mainly spent in the SM-liiga. He was drafted by the New York Islanders as their ninth-round pick, #267 overall, in the 2000 NHL Entry Draft.

Pettinen came to North America in 2002 to play for Islanders minor league club, the Bridgeport Sound Tigers. While in his native Finland, he has played for Ilves, HIFK, and Lukko.

Career statistics

External links

1977 births
Living people
Bridgeport Sound Tigers players
Finnish ice hockey defencemen
Frölunda HC players
HIFK (ice hockey) players
Ilves players
Kokkolan Hermes players
Leksands IF players
Lukko players
New York Islanders draft picks
New York Islanders players
People from Ylöjärvi
Sportspeople from Pirkanmaa